Sinovation Ventures is a Beijing-based venture capital firm founded in 2009. The firm focuses on investing in startups that use artificial intelligence technology. It was one of the first Chinese venture capital firms to establish a presence in the United States.

Background 
Kai-Fu Lee was President of Google China from July 2005 to September 4, 2009. A few days after resigning from his post, on September 7, 2009, he announced he would be starting a $115m venture capital fund called "Innovation Works". His colleague, Hua Wang who was previously Head of Business Development in Google China joined him as a co-founder.

In 2013, a office was opened in Silicon Valley to invest in US startups.

In 2016, the firm rebranded from "Innovation Works" to "Sinovation Ventures".

In 2019, the firm closed its Silicon Valley office citing the China–United States trade war making it difficult to get into US deals.

Funds

Notable Investments 

 AdMob
 Bitmain
 Insilico Medicine
 Megvii
 MeituPic
 Mobike
 Momenta
 Niu Technologies
 Planetary Resources
 Securly
 TuSimple
 VIPKID
 WeRide
 Wonder Workshop
 Zhihu

References

External links
 

Chinese companies established in 2009
Financial services companies established in 2009
Investment management companies of China
Venture capital firms of China